75 Broad Street is a Category B listed building in Peterhead, Aberdeenshire, Scotland. It dates to 1835, and was originally a Clydesdale Bank. It is believed to have been designed by Archibald Simpson.

As of 2020, the building is home to the offices of the North East of Scotland Fishermen's Organisation.

See also
List of listed buildings in Peterhead, Aberdeenshire

References

External links
 73, 75 BROAD STREET FORMER CLYDESDALE BANK - Historic Environment Scotland

Category B listed buildings in Aberdeenshire
Broad Street 75
1840 establishments in Scotland
Commercial buildings completed in 1835
Clydesdale Bank